Era Vulgaris is the fifth studio album by American rock band Queens of the Stone Age. Recorded from July 2006 to April 2007, it was released on June 11, 2007 in the United Kingdom and June 12 in the United States, having been released on June 8 in other countries. The single "Sick, Sick, Sick" was released in May, followed by second single "3's & 7's" in early June, and third single "Make It wit Chu" in October. The album debuted at No. 14 on the U.S. Billboard 200 charts, selling 52,000 copies in its first week. It reached top ten positions in other countries, such as No. 7 in the UK, No. 5 in Canada, and No. 4 in Australia. It was the band's last album with Interscope Records.

Overview and background 
While 2002's Songs for the Deaf was said to be inspired by frontman Josh Homme's tedious drives through the Southern Californian desert, the inspiration for Era Vulgaris came from his daily drives through Hollywood. He described the record as "dark, hard, and electrical, sort of like a construction worker" and said "it's like dirt, clearly seen". The album's title refers to the Latin term for Common Era. The title was chosen by Homme because he thought "it sounds like 'the Vulgar Era', which I like, because that sounds like something that I would like to be part of... I mean I think we're in it, and I'm stoked". Two tracks from the album had previously been released or performed elsewhere. "Into the Hollow" had been performed by Homme and Chris Goss as The Fififf Teeners (with the two also producing Era Vulgaris), and "Make It wit Chu" had been recorded as a Desert Sessions track, as well as appearing on the live album Over the Years and Through the Woods.

Production

Pre-production speculation and contributors 
In June 2006, in an interview on the Australian radio station Triple J, bassist Jesse F. Keeler from Death from Above 1979 revealed that he would be playing bass on an upcoming Queens of the Stone Age album, but that he would more than likely not be touring with the band due to his desire to spend more time with his girlfriend. Eventually, on his band's internet forum, Keeler revealed that he would not be appearing on the album due to conflicting schedules. In a July interview with NME, Homme confirmed that the band was back in the studio and writing, but he remained unwilling to reveal who would appear in the band on the new record, stating, "That's not a healthy question. You'll ruin the surprise. We've gotta keep our cool." The album was expected to include guest performances by Trent Reznor, Julian Casablancas, Mark Lanegan, Billy Gibbons, and (jokingly) deceased humorist Erma Bombeck. Of these, however, only Casablancas' and Lanegan's tracks appear on the U.S. release: Casablancas performed synth guitar and backing vocals on "Sick, Sick, Sick", while Lanegan sang backing vocals on "River in the Road". Scheduling conflicts prevented Gibbons from appearing on the record, while the album's title track (featuring Reznor) was released separately on the You Know What You Did promotional CD and the UK edition of the album.

Recording 
The album was recorded with "exactly zero input from [record label] Interscope Records" between July 2006 and April 2007 at Cherokee Studios in Hollywood, Steakhouse Studios in Los Angeles, and Sound City Studios in Van Nuys. It was mixed at Bay 7 Studios in North Hollywood. The album was recorded and mixed by Alain Johannes, and produced by Josh Homme and Chris Goss under the name The Fififf Teeners. The primary contributors to the recording were Homme, Troy van Leeuwen, Joey Castillo, Johannes, and Goss.

In an interview with SuicideGirls on June 16, 2007, Van Leeuwen said, "We basically started a year ago. And like I said, we didn't really have anything written. So it was a long process. It was the longest I've ever taken to make a record, frankly. I've made records over the process of a year but this was the first time it's ever been my total focus for that long. This was the first time I've ever done that... total focus for 10 months."

Goss and Johannes were replaced by Dean Fertita (keyboard) and Michael Shuman (bass) for later bonus track recordings and the subsequent supporting tour. Regarding the band's line-up changes for Era Vulgaris, Homme commented, "I like combinations that no one would expect... it's the cool part of any surprise party."

Musical style and influences 

Era Vulgaris displays influences from many different genres. The album departs from the softer, hollow-body guitar sound of their previous album Lullabies to Paralyze with heavy, crunchy guitars and some electronic influences. Rolling Stone noted the influence of Gary Numan "all over this record". Musically, the album has been described as "brand new retro", a fusion of "punk, rock, blues, and southern grit" (in an FHM review), and slower, moodier, and groggier than the band's previous efforts.

Marketing and promotion

Behind the scenes and promotional contest 

Shortly after the album's announcement in February 2007, a video was posted on the band's official website showing Homme, Castillo, and Van Leeuwen jamming. Along with brief footage of the recording session for "Misfit Love", the last six or seven seconds of the video contained footage of the recording of "3's & 7's" accompanied by studio-mastered audio. A second video of the recording of the album surfaced subsequently on YouTube, depicting the band (this time including Johannes) recording a new track, "Turning on the Screw", in the studio.

In early April, the band's website was updated with a 37-second excerpt from "Sick, Sick, Sick". This was replaced by the song "3's and 7's" in its entirety, which was later removed. Fan site thefade.net announced a promotional contest for fans to win a "special package" from the band, confirmed as legitimate by the band's webmaster. On April 13, packages were sent to selected winners containing a CD entitled You Know What You Did with the sole track "Era Vulgaris", which Homme confirmed would not be appearing on the record despite being the title track, although it was included as a bonus track on the UK edition.

The CD was accompanied by a handwritten letter asking fans to share the song in any way possible:

The song "The Fun Machine Took a Shit & Died" was recorded for a CD single released with pre-ordered copies of the album at Insound.com and Newbury Comics, and it later appeared as a bonus track on the Brazilian, German, and Japanese editions of the album.

Bulby, Xfm and soundtracks 

The full track "Sick, Sick, Sick" was leaked online, countered by the posting of a promotional video to the band's site featuring a "sales pitch" for Era Vulgaris by two anthropomorphic lightbulbs, followed by an official streaming of "Sick, Sick, Sick" with lyrics displayed in the background.

On May 2, 2007, Homme, Van Leeuwen, and new band member Dean Fertita appeared on London radio station Xfm, performing an acoustic set that included the tracks "3's & 7's", "Into the Hollow", and "Suture Up Your Future".

It was announced that songs would appear in the video games Madden NFL 08, Guitar Hero III: Legends of Rock, and Rock Band, specifically that the track "3's & 7's" would be featured in Madden NFL 08 and Guitar Hero III: Legends of Rock. Both "3's & 7's" and "Sick, Sick, Sick" are available as downloadable content on Rock Band and Rock Band 2. In addition, "Make It wit Chu" was later included in Guitar Hero 5.

Artwork 

The album's cover features the two lightbulbs from the promotional video, Bulby and his pirate accomplice (pictured right), marking a change from the plainer designs of the bands' previous albums. According to Homme, the light bulb represented "…what you perceive to be a great idea that really is not that great of an idea". The cover was a slip of paper, with a simplified credits page on the back side, marked with the outline of the record. The typography follows an Old English style font; Blackmoor, with the 'Spermy Q' seen on their album Songs for the Deaf.

An art booklet was also included, featuring "Bulby" and several other characters which unfolded to display a pin-up advertisement for the album, following the 1950s advertising satire as the rest of the album art followed. The lack of liner notes for the album was remedied when the official website allowed users to view an e-booklet, containing more detailed liner notes, lyrics, and previously unseen artwork. The green light bulb with the pirate hat, eye patch and peg leg is known as "Stumpy".

Some copies of the album cover contain a red and yellow rectangle spoofing the Parental Advisory seal, reading "Rental Advisory: Freedom Not for Purchase". Coincidentally, it was the first Queens of the Stone Age album since Rated R to not bear a genuine Parental Advisory seal.

The lightbulb characters were created by Morning Breath Inc. with overall art direction from Jason Noto and Doug Cunningham of Morning Breath Inc.

Reception 

Reviews for the album were generally mixed to positive, earning a rating of 75 out of 100 on Metacritic, a decline from their previous two studio albums. Uncut and Allmusic's reviews were particularly glowing, with the latter noting how Era Vulgaris is "as different from Lullabies as that was to their dramatic widescreen breakthrough, Songs for the Deaf". Originally awarding the album with a four-and-a-half star rating, Allmusic changed this to a four-star rating in 2013 upon the release of the band's follow-up ...Like Clockwork.

The Observer also commented on the album's change in direction, commenting that the band had "turned its back on the mainstream" and that the album was "uneasy and brooding" and "gripping stuff". Rolling Stone gave the album four stars for the first time since the band's self titled debut, commenting that "Era Vulgaris is Homme's fifth Queens album, and like the others, it's intricately crafted, meticulously polished and ruthlessly efficient in its pursuit of depraved rock thrills." Critic Jon Pareles of The New York Times selected the album as the tenth best release of 2007.

A number of reviews were negative, however; Q magazine gave the album two stars out of five, while The Village Voice criticized Homme for lack of originality, describing the record's sound as "listless and drained of ideas". The Guardian slated the record as lyrically clichéd and lacking the input of former bassist Nick Oliveri, and Entertainment Weekly delivered the closing indictment that "there isn't a single song here that you'll remember, or want to return to, two summers hence."

Era Vulgaris had sold 198,000 copies in the US, and 521,000 copies worldwide before falling off the charts. The US sales are a decline from their previous album, as Lullabies to Paralyze, had sold 342,000 copies in the US by March 2007.  Neither album achieved the commercial success of the band's 2002 release, Songs for the Deaf, which had sold 986,000 copies in the US alone as of June 2007.

Track listing 
All tracks were written by Josh Homme, Troy Van Leeuwen, and Joey Castillo, except for "Sick, Sick, Sick" (Homme, Goss, Van Leeuwen, Castillo) and "Make It wit Chu" (Homme, Johannes, Melchiondo).

Personnel 
According to the album liner notes, the contributors were as follows:

Queens of the Stone Age
 Josh Homme – lead vocals, guitar, backing vocals, lead guitar (tracks 1, 3, 7, and 8), acoustic guitar ("Battery Acid"), percussion ("Turnin' on the Screw"), bass guitar (tracks 4, 5, 6, 8, 9, 10, and 11), lap steel guitar ("Into the Hollow"), keyboard ("Into the Hollow"), electric piano (tracks 8 and 9), Rhodes piano ("Make It wit Chu"), "badly tuned" piano ("Run, Pig, Run"), organ ("River in the Road"), "percussion ball" ("Run, Pig, Run")
 Troy Van Leeuwen – keyboard (tracks 1, 2, 5, and 6), guitar (tracks 1, 2, 3, 4, 7, 8, and 11), lead guitar (tracks 5, 6, and 9), "crazy delay" guitar ("River in the Road"), lap steel guitar ("3's & 7's"), backing vocals (tracks 1, 2, 6, and 7), bass (tracks 2 and 7), "the percussion part that's a bitch" ("Turnin' on the Screw"), Moog ("I'm Designer"), Rhodes piano ("Into the Hollow")
 Joey Castillo – drums, percussion (tracks 1 and 7), "percussion ball" ("Run, Pig, Run")

Guest appearances 
 Alain Johannes – bass guitar (tracks 1 and 3), acoustic guitar ("Run, Pig, Run"), counterpoint guitar ("Misfit Love"), harmonic guitar ("Make It wit Chu"), counterpoint fiddle ("Misfit Love"), "cig" fiddle ("Run, Pig, Run"), marxaphone ("Run, Pig, Run"), backing vocals ("Run, Pig, Run")
 Chris Goss – keyboard ("Into the Hollow"), "the chicken pluckin' guitar" ("Turnin' on the Screw"), "twinkley bits" ("Sick, Sick, Sick"), organ ("Misfit Love"), electric piano ("Suture Up Your Future"), "eclectic piano" ("Battery Acid"), bass ("River in the Road"), backing vocals (tracks 7 and 11)
 Julian Casablancas – synth guitar and vocals ("Sick, Sick, Sick")
 Serrina Sims – backing vocals ("Make It wit Chu")
 Brody Dalle-Homme – backing vocals ("Make It wit Chu")
 Liam Lynch – backing vocals ("Make It wit Chu")
 Mark Lanegan – harmony vocals ("River in the Road")

Technical 
 Chris Goss & Josh Homme (as The Fififf Teeners) − producers
 Alain Johannes − engineering and mixing
 Joe Barresi − mixing
 Justin Smith − mixing assistant
 Stephen Marcussen − mastering
 Jason Noto − design, illustrations
 Dr. Mark A. Williams − A&R

Charts

Weekly charts

Year-end charts

Certifications

Singles chart positions

References

External links 
 

Queens of the Stone Age albums
2007 albums
Albums produced by Josh Homme
Albums produced by Chris Goss
Interscope Records albums